Lucian Baxter Wintrich IV (né Einhorn; born May 24, 1988) is an American artist, photographer, writer, speaker, and the former White House correspondent for far-right fake news website The Gateway Pundit.

Wintrich currently serves on the board of governors for the New York Young Republican Club and is the club's Activism Committee Chairman.

Early life and education 
Wintrich was born Lucian Baxter Einhorn in Pittsburgh, Pennsylvania, and grew up in the Squirrel Hill neighborhood. He is the eldest son, his mother is a painter and experimental filmmaker, and his father owns a design firm. Many of Wintrich’s European ancestors were executed during the Second World War, some for their Jewish ancestry and others as members of the aristocracy. His paternal grandfather, Jerzy Einhorn, a Jewish medical doctor, born in Sosnowiec, Poland, served as a cavalry officer in the Polish resistance before being promoted to lieutenant colonel by the Polish Ministry of Defense.

Wintrich attended the experimental prep school Fanny Edel Falk Laboratory School and then Taylor Allderdice High School. In the fall of 2005, Wintrich created the podcast "Acorns & Merlot," characterized by the Pittsburgh Post Gazette as "sometimes irreverent or crude [but] often hilarious."

Wintrich received his BA from Bard College in Annandale-on-Hudson, New York, where he majored in political science. His graduate thesis at Bard was titled "Electronic Democracy and Electronic Propaganda: The New Media as a Political Tool."

At the age of 18, Wintrich legally changed his name to Lucian Baxter Wintrich IV. This change included both the reversion to a historic family surname and the addition of a fictitious suffix, which Wintrich told a reporter he selected to "make it all the funnier".

Career

Advertising 
In 2013, Wintrich worked as a Digital Strategist for advertising agency Anomaly and as a promoter for New York City clubs. He was dismissed from his position at Anomaly after his "Twinks4Trump" photo series garnered national attention. In an op-ed for The Hill, Wintrich stated that he was up for a promotion before his dismissal. Wintrich sued Anomaly for wrongful termination and reached an out-of-court settlement.

Photography 

Wintrich gained public attention from his viral photo series "Twinks4Trump". Adam Shaw of Fox News reported that the photo series was created by Wintrich "as a way to challenge both the religious right, and the progressive left". Wintrich primarily shot the photo series in his East Village apartment. The series captured shirtless gay twinks sporting "Make America Great Again" baseball caps. The series premiered at the "Wake Up!" event in downtown Cleveland during the Republican National Convention. Tessa Stuart of Rolling Stone stated, "Wake-Up! is both a convention of trolls, and a troll of the convention wrapping up its second night just up the street." Wintrich's photos served as the backdrop for speakers such as Pamela Geller, Geert Wilders, Jim Hoft, and Milo Yiannopoulos. In an op-ed for The Art Newspaper, Dan Duray derided Wintrich’s work as "Ryan McGinley but without any sense of balance, colour depth, technical acuity, texture, lighting, warmth, joie de vivre, basic humanity and sexiness, and add Make America Great Again hats."

Art Curation 

Wintrich was the organizer and curator of the pro-Donald Trump presidential candidacy "#DaddyWillSaveUs" art exhibition, which Wintrich billed as "the first pro-Trump art show in the nation's history". Wintrich stated the impetus for the show was "a slap in the face to the art world and to progressive identity politics." and "a subversive force against the myth of the left dominating the art world." The exhibition included paintings of George Washington and Martin Luther King Jr in pro-Trump hats, an "Emotional First Aid Kit" by James O'Keefe, a single pill with a list price of $20,000 by Martin Shkreli, a photo triptych by Gavin McInnis, and Milo Yiannopoulos bathing in pig blood as a "performance art piece". The show featured an open bar and deliberate provocations such as mini taco bowls and mini gold-flaked egg roll hors d'oeuvres, served by men in "racially insensitive costumes", according to Gothamist. The show was featured in the 2021 documentary Pharma Bro.

The exhibition was crowdfunded by $22,500 raised on Indiegogo and via private donor contributions. Joe Amrhein, owner of the initial venue for the event, Boiler (Pierogi Gallery), canceled his contract with Wintrich stating to Artnet, "He can find somewhere else to show it. [...] Down deep I thought a satirical show about Trump was a good idea, and still do, but [Wintrich] really believes in this stuff. It's all about freedom of speech, according to him and now we're "non believers"".

Wintrich rebutted, "While I am very disappointed by Joe Amrhein's false statement, I am more disappointed that he caved under pressure from others who call themselves "artists". The show relocated to Wallplay Gallery in Manhattan's SoHo neighborhood.

Wintrich initially planned to offer 30% of the proceeds from the art show to American Military Partners Association, an LGBTQ veteran group; however, they declined the donation. ArtNet placed the show on its list of "Art that mattered from the 2016 Presidential election." W Magazine listed it among the "Feuds That Fueled the Art World's Gossip Mill in 2016".

White House Correspondent 
The day before Donald Trump's inauguration, Wintrich was named the inaugural White House correspondent for St. Louis-based publication Gateway Pundit.

Despite having no formal journalism experience, Wintrich was granted White House briefing credentials by the incoming Administration.

Speaking to CNBC, Wintrich stated, "What a lot of the legacy media doesn't realize is that by reacting so emotionally to things like Saturday's press conference, they're providing fodder for people like me and allowing us the chance to call them out as reactionary children while we actually cover the Trump presidency."

Wintrich said his role as a White House correspondent was twofold. "writing about dry policy stuff" and "trolling the media." He also referred to it as "performance art" in the Pittsburgh Post Gazette.

Much of Wintrich's time as a White House correspondent was spent deriding the media itself rather than reporting on the Administration. He spawned the "#FireColbert" movement, wherein he characterized the night show host's joke involving Trump and Vladimir Putin in a gay relationship as a "disgusting 12-minute homophobic rant."

In Washington, Wintrich served as the Gateway Pundit’s public face created press and news stories in other publicans for the Gateway Pundit. The president of Media Matters remarked that "he is not really doing what a White House correspondent does, but he wasn't supposed to. They're looking for that moment when they get a viral response." Although initially considered to be aligned with the alt-right movement, he later disavowed it, saying that white supremacist Richard Spencer ruined the term.

On August 10, 2018, Right Wing Watch published an account of Wintrich's appearance on a podcast hosted by Nick Fuentes, who has been described as a white nationalist (a label which Fuentes himself denies). According to Right Wing Watch, Wintrich and Fuentes debated immigration and anti-white racism, among other topics.

On the same day, The Gateway Pundit founder Jim Hoft announced via Twitter that Wintrich had left the organization several weeks earlier. Later, Wintrich appeared in a Periscope live stream where he conversed with admirers as he prepared to boil two lobsters, one of which he named for the Right Wing Watch reporter Jared Holt, who had publicized Wintrich's appearance on Fuentes's program.

Controversies
On February 15, 2017, Wintrich was scheduled to speak to the College Republicans at New York University (NYU), but the talk was postponed over security concerns. On March 23, 2017, he addressed the NYU College Republicans.

On March 10, 2017, Wintrich was confronted by a fellow White House correspondent, Jon Decker of Fox News in the White House Briefing Room, who loudly accused Wintrich of being a white supremacist. Wintrich fired back at Decker, calling him a "nazi homophobe". After the briefing, April Ryan of American Urban Radio Networks approached Wintrich with a live camera and questioned him whether or not he was a racist. Ben Jacobs of The Guardian described Wintrich engaging with Ryan as him "holding his own briefing because nothing matters."

In May 2017, Wintrich encountered Malia Obama at the now defunct Parlor club in Soho, New York. Malia Obama ran up to confront Wintrich at the private social club; Wintrich told Jennifer Mass of Hollywood Life, "I started laughing. I turned around and it was Malia Obama staring me down so I tried to snap a picture while she was staring me down and she came up to me and started yelling."

On November 28, 2017, Wintrich was arrested after an altercation in which he, as an invited guest speaker, was lecturing at the podium, when a woman came up heckling and ultimately snatched the written copy of his speech directly from the lectern during a talk at the University of Connecticut entitled "It's OK to Be White". He was initially charged with breach of peace. In December 2017, the charges against Wintrich were dropped and the woman who took the papers, Quinebaug community college advisor Catherine Gregory, was charged with attempted sixth-degree larceny and disorderly conduct.

Gregory was freed after posting $1,000 bail on charges of attempted larceny and disorderly conduct. She stated through her attorney that she took Wintrich's speech as a form of protest. The charges against her were later dropped after she agreed to a one-year campus ban and a $500 donation to the university.

In January 2018, it was revealed that Wintrich was close associates with Chelsea Manning. Outings for the two included an "Escape Room" in Washington, DC and cocktail parties at Wintrich's Washington, DC, apartment where journalists and public figures would play Cards Against Humanity. As Manning was aligned with far-left groups such as ANTIFA at the time, the relationship generated upset and confusion in the press.

In February 2018, Wintrich tweeted the conspiracy theory that some survivors of the Stoneman Douglas High School shooting, who had spoken to the media about gun control in the wake of the tragedy, were "trained actors who were recruited by [George] Soros-linked organizations as spokespeople after a crisis." The tweet was liked by Donald Trump Jr. but was much criticized by others, including shooting survivor David Hogg, whom Wintrich accused of being "heavily coached" for interviews. Wintrich defended his claim in Vanity Fair stating, "All of a sudden, these kids are not only suddenly brilliant at incendiary rhetoric, but also incredible graphic designers [and web developers], and some of the best organizational minds in the country—and they just came out of nowhere? Give me a break."

In March 2020, during the 2019–2020 coronavirus pandemic, Wintrich held a "coronavirus potluck". Wintrich said that the potluck was inspired by the chickenpox parties of the 1990s. The invitation included an image of a chickenpox-infected child and a fork holding a COVID-19 spore. The New York Post reported, "About 20 people jammed his artfully-decorated apartment, drinking and socializing under Wintrich’s massive erotic oil painting depicting the murder of Abel, encased in a gilded baroque frame."

References

Living people
American people of Polish-Jewish descent
People from Pittsburgh
Bard College alumni
American artists
21st-century American journalists
American LGBT journalists
American gay writers
Alt-right writers
Taylor Allderdice High School alumni
LGBT conservatism in the United States
1988 births